St. Landry Parish Airport , also known as Ahart Field, is a public use airport located two nautical miles (4 km) northwest of the central business district of Opelousas, a city in St. Landry Parish, Louisiana, United States.

Facilities and aircraft 
It has two concrete paved runways: 18/36 measuring 5,999 x 100 ft (1,828 x 30 m) and 6/24 measuring 4,051 x 100 ft (1,235 x 30 m).

For the 12-month period ending June 26, 2007, the airport had 18,000 general aviation aircraft operations, an average of 49 per day. At that time there were 34 aircraft based at this airport: 74% single-engine, 24% multi-engine and 3% ultralight.

References

External links 

Airports in Louisiana